Tarom Sar (also Romanized as Ţārom Sar) is a village in Luleman Rural District, Kuchesfahan District, Rasht County, Gilan Province, Iran. At the 2006 census, its population was 1,260, in 354 families.

References 

Populated places in Rasht County